Walter P. Manning (May 3, 1920 – April 3, 1945) was an American fighter pilot of the primarily African American Tuskegee Airmen. He flew 50 missions, and was awarded the Air Medal for heroism six times. After being shot down in 1945, he was captured in Austria and subsequently lynched by a mob. He was posthumously awarded the Congressional Gold Medal in 2007 along with all other Tuskegee Airmen. Manning is the only known black man to have been lynched in Austria during World War II.

Military service

World War II 

In 1942 Manning was rejected for military service because of a hammer toe. Manning used his savings to pay for surgery to repair his toe so that he could enlist. In 1943 he enlisted in the Army Air Force. In 1944, after graduating from the Tuskegee Institute he was assigned to the 301st Fighter Squadron, 332nd fighter Group with the rank of 2nd lieutenant. He served as a pilot from Ramitelli Air Base, Italy.

Dogfight
Manning was involved in a dogfight with German planes on Easter morning, April 1, 1945, over the Danube River in Austria. The Tuskegee Airmen were escorting B-24 bombers on a bombing mission to the town of St. Polten, Austria. On the return trip to their base at Ramitelli Air Field in Italy, the group spotted enemy planes near Wels, Austria. There were seven Tuskegee Airmen flying the mission that day who engaged the German planes. The American pilots shot down 12 German planes in the dogfight. However three of the Tuskegee Airmen's planes were shot down in return: one pilot was able to crash-land in friendly territory, one was killed outright when he was shot down, and the third pilot was Manning: his plane was damaged so badly that he had to bail out. He parachuted to a waiting mob but was pulled away by a local policeman.

Lynching
Manning was captured and jailed in Austria at a Luftwaffe Air Force base near Linz. On April 3, 1945, a mob of civilians, agitated by SS troops and helped by Luftwaffe officers broke into the jailhouse and tied Manning's hands behind his back. They dragged Manning outside and beat him badly. They hung a wooden tablet around his neck that read "We help ourselves! The Werwolf", and hanged him from a lamppost.

American soldiers discovered his body in a shallow grave near the air base. A civilian had marked the spot with a wooden cross. Although they found clear signs of murder US officials closed his case early. Suspects were identified, including two German officers believed to be part of the Werwolf guerilla group. However, nobody was prosecuted.

Research and commemoration 
In 2013 the Austrian historians Nicole-Melanie Goll and Georg Hoffmann carried out a research project together with Jerry Whiting to examine the fates of downed Allied airmen, including Manning. Together they created a database of the 9,000 Allied pilots killed or shot down over Austria. The historians discovered that 150 Allied pilots, 101 of them American, were murdered on the ground, most by civilians. While white airmen were either shot or beaten to death, Manning was hanged. As a result of their findings the Austrian Army raised a commemoration plaque at the place where Walter Manning was murdered.

Awards
Air Medal for heroism with 5 Oak Leaf Clusters,
European–African–Middle Eastern Campaign Medal (EAME)
Purple Heart Medal.
Congressional Gold Medal (2007) (posthumously)

Personal life
Manning was born in Baltimore, Maryland but grew up in Philadelphia, Pennsylvania. He loved swimming and growing up he always wanted to fly planes. He attended Howard University. Before leaving for war Manning was engaged to Dicey Thomas.

See also
 Rüsselsheim massacre - the lynching of 6 American airmen in the German town of Rüsselheim
 Freeman Field Mutiny
 List of Tuskegee Airmen
 Military history of African Americans

References

Notes

External links
 Tuskegee Airmen at Tuskegee University
 Tuskegee Airmen Archives at the University of California, Riverside Libraries.
 Tuskegee Airmen, Inc.
 Tuskegee Airmen National Historic Site (U.S. National Park Service) 
 Tuskegee Airmen National Museum
 Executive Order 9981
 List of African American Medal of Honor recipients
 Military history of African Americans

1920 births
1945 deaths
People from Baltimore
Tuskegee Airmen
Tuskegee University alumni
Military personnel from Tuskegee, Alabama
Congressional Gold Medal recipients
United States Army Air Forces personnel killed in World War II
1945 murders in Austria
Lynching deaths
Shot-down aviators
American people murdered abroad
People murdered in Austria